The 1978 Rothmans 500 was an endurance motor race for Group C Touring Cars. The event was held at Oran Park in New South Wales, Australia on 4 June 1978 over 222 laps of the 2.7 km circuit, a total distance of 599.4 km. This was the second and last Rothmans 500 race for Touring Cars to be held at Oran Park, the 1977 Rothmans 500 having been the inaugural event.

Results

References

Further reading
Jim Shepherd, A History of Australian Motor Sport, 1980, page 150

External links
Images from the 1978 Rothmans 500 Retrieved from www.autopics.com.au on 6 April 2009

Rothmans 500